Anna Boada Peiró (born 30 December 1992) is a Spanish competitive rower.

She competed at the 2016 Summer Olympics in Rio de Janeiro, in the women's coxless pair.

References

External links

1992 births
Living people
Spanish female rowers
Olympic rowers of Spain
Rowers at the 2016 Summer Olympics